Bofan (also Beifan Town) is a town in northeastern Hubei province, China, located just north of G70 Fuzhou–Yinchuan Expressway and under the administration of Anlu City, the centre of which lies  to the southeast.

Administrative divisions 
The town is made up of 3 subdistricts and 14 villages including Bofan Community and Sanli Community.

, the town had 17 villages under its administration. , the town was made up of 17 villages.

Villages:
Bofan, Dumiao, Liulin, Sanli, Yangyan, Yueling, Banjin, Chenhe, Changsong, Hengshan, Caopeng, Qinglongtan, Longwo, Tongxing, Zhangfan, Tianzigang, Caofan

Demographics

See also 
 List of township-level divisions of Hubei

References 

Township-level divisions of Hubei